Levi Wallace (born June 12, 1995) is an American football cornerback for the Pittsburgh Steelers of the National Football League (NFL). He played college football at Alabama.

Early years
Wallace attended Tucson High School in Tucson, Arizona, where he played football and track and field. Wallace committed to the University of Alabama to play college football.

College career
Wallace did not see any action during his freshman and sophomore years at Alabama. He earned a walk-on scholarship before his junior year in 2016. In 6 games, Wallace totaled 11 tackles. During his senior year, Wallace started in 14 games. He was a starter during the 2018 College Football Playoff National Championship game, where Alabama won in overtime over Georgia, 26-23. Wallace totaled 48 tackles and caught 3 interceptions in his senior year.

Professional career

Buffalo Bills

2018 season
On May 1, 2018, the Buffalo Bills signed Wallace to a three-year, $1.71 million contract as an undrafted free agent. Throughout training camp, Wallace competed for a roster spot as a backup cornerback against Taron Johnson, Ryan Carter, Breon Borders, and Lafayette Pitts. On September 1, 2018, the Buffalo Bills waived Wallace as part of their final roster cuts, but signed him to their practice squad the following day.

On November 6, 2018, the Buffalo Bills promoted Wallace from their practice squad to the active roster after releasing Phillip Gaines. On November 11, 2018, Wallace made his professional regular season debut and first career start and made one tackle and a pass deflection during a 41-10 victory at the New York Jets in Week 10. In Week 16, he collected a season-high eight combined tackles during a 24-12 loss at the New England Patriots. He finished his rookie season in 2018 with 37 combined tackles (24 solo) and three pass deflections in seven games and seven starts. Wallace received an overall grade of 83.5 from Pro Football Focus, which ranked fifth among all qualifying cornerbacks in 2018. He also received the highest grade among all rookie cornerbacks.

2019 season
Wallace was named a starting cornerback to begin the season, opposite Tre'Davious White. Following an inconsistent start to the season, Wallace eventually saw his playing time reduced in favor of Kevin Johnson. In week 15, Wallace caught his first career interception against the Pittsburgh Steelers on Sunday Night Football, picking off Devlin Hodges to seal a 17–10 Bills victory in the final moments to help Buffalo clinch a playoff berth. In the regular season finale against the New York Jets, Wallace logged another interception off Sam Darnold, but suffered a sprained ankle on the play, which kept him out of the Bills' playoff game against the Houston Texans.

2020 season
On April 2, 2020, Wallace was re-signed to a one-year contract by the Bills, regaining his starting position despite the team signing veteran cornerback Josh Norman. In Week 3 against the Los Angeles Rams, Wallace recorded his first interception of the season during the 35–32 win.  Wallace injured his ankle the following week against the Las Vegas Raiders and was ruled out the rest of the game. He was placed on injured reserve on October 7, 2020. He was activated on October 31. He was placed on the reserve/COVID-19 list on November 14, 2020, and activated on November 19. In Week 14 against the Pittsburgh Steelers on Sunday Night Football, Wallace intercepted a pass thrown by Ben Roethlisberger late in the fourth quarter to secure a 26–15 win for the Bills.

In the Divisional Round of the playoffs against the Baltimore Ravens, Wallace recorded one sack on Lamar Jackson during the 17–3 win.

2021 season
Wallace re-signed with the Bills on a one-year contract on March 26, 2021. He became the top cornerback on the roster after White suffered a torn ACL in week 12 and missed the rest of the season, but Buffalo still finished the year with the league's top passing defense despite White's injury. Wallace, in particular, allowed just a 72.6 passer rating when targeted by opposing quarterbacks.

Pittsburgh Steelers
On March 17, 2022, the Pittsburgh Steelers signed Wallace to a two-year, $8 million contract that includes a signing bonus of $2.96 million.

References

External links

Alabama Crimson Tide bio
Buffalo Bills bio

1995 births
Living people
Alabama Crimson Tide football players
American football defensive backs
Buffalo Bills players
Pittsburgh Steelers players
Players of American football from Tucson, Arizona
Tucson High School alumni